The 2013 CIS football season began on August 25, 2013, with ten Ontario University Athletics teams playing that day. The season concluded on November 23 with the 49th Vanier Cup championship in Quebec City, won by the Laval Rouge et Or after they defeated the Calgary Dinos 25–14. This year, 27 university teams in Canada played Canadian Interuniversity Sport football, the highest level of amateur Canadian football. The Carleton Ravens football team re-joined the CIS after a 14-year absence, increasing the number of OUA teams to 11 and necessitating the use of bye weeks in that conference.

Regular season standings

Top 10 

Ranks in italics are teams not ranked in the top 10 poll but received votes.
NR = Not Ranked, received no votes.
Number in parentheses denotes number votes, after the dash number of first place votes.

Championships 
The 49th Vanier Cup is played between the champions of the Mitchell Bowl and the Uteck Bowl, the national semi-final games. In 2013, according to the rotating schedule, the Atlantic conference Loney Bowl champions will host the Dunsmore Cup Quebec championship team for the Uteck Bowl. The winners of the Canada West conference Hardy Trophy will host the Ontario conference's Yates Cup champion for the Mitchell Bowl.

Post-season awards

All-Canadian team 

 First team 
Offence
 Jordan Heather, QB, Bishop's
 Mercer Timmis, RB, Calgary
 Anthony Coombs, RB, Manitoba
 Alexander Fox, IR, Bishop's
 Brian Marshall, IR, Western
 George Johnson, WR, Western
 Paul de Pass, WR, Toronto
 Pierre Lavertu, C, Laval
 Karl Lavoie, OT, Laval
 Laurent Duvernay-Tardif, OT, McGill
 Jas Dhillon, G, British Columbia
 Charles Vaillancourt, G, Laval
Defence
 Ettore Lattanzio, DT, Ottawa
 Donovan Dale, DT, British Columbia
 Derek Wiggan, DE, Queen's
 Jesse St. James, DE, Acadia
 Pawel Kruba, LB, Western
 Doctor Cassama, LB, Calgary
 Beau Landry, LB, Western
 Kwame Adjei, FS, Mount Allison
 Brett Backman, HB, Acadia
 Cyril Iwanegbe, HB, Calgary
 Andrew Lue, CB, Queen's
 Maximilien Ducap, CB, Laval
Special teams
 Quinn van Gylswyk, P, British Columbia
 Johnny Mark, K, Calgary
 Kevin Bradfield, RET, Toronto
 Second team 
Offence
 Will Finch, QB, Western
 Brendan Gillanders, RB, Ottawa
 Jordan Botel, RB, Mount Allison
 Nic Demski, IR, Manitoba
 Evan Pszczonak, IR, Windsor
 Taylor Renaud, WR, Acadia
 Addison Richards, WR, Regina
 Sean McEwen, C, Calgary
 Josh Prinsen, OT, Queen's
 Alec Pennell, OT, British Columbia
 Sukh Chungh, G, Calgary
 Cameron Thorn, G, Guelph
Defence
 Brandon Tennant, DT, Laval
 Daryl Waud, DT, Western
 Joel Seutter, DE, Saskatchewan
 Dylan Ainsworth, DE, Western
 Ron Omara, LB, St. Francis Xavier
 Sam Sabourin, LB, Queen's
 Antoine Pruneau, LB, Montreal
 Mark Ingram, FS, Saskatchewan
 TJ Chase-Dunawa, HB, Queen's
 Cameron Wade, HB, Acadia
 Tevaughn Campbell, CB, Regina
 Eric Black, CB, Saint Mary's
Special teams
 Boris Bede, P, Laval
 Lirim Hajrullahu, K, Western
 Guillaume Rioux, RET, Laval

Teams

References 

2013 in Canadian football
U Sports football seasons